Michael Krohn-Dehli (born 6 June 1983) is a Danish former professional footballer. He played mostly as an attacking midfielder, but was also deployed as a winger.

A technically gifted player, Krohn-Dehli started his professional career in the Netherlands, but would make his breakthrough for native childhood club, Brøndby IF, where he amassed 26 goals in 122 Danish Superliga appearances. This earned him a move to Celta in Spain, where he remained for the rest of his career, also representing Sevilla and Deportivo La Coruña.

A Danish international, Krohn-Dehli won 62 caps for the country, representing it at the 2018 World Cup and at Euro 2012.

Club career

Early career
Born in Copenhagen, Krohn-Dehli began playing football at Rosenhøj BK in Denmark. After that he played for Danish clubs Hvidovre IF and Brøndby IF.

In 2002, Krohn-Dehli joined Ajax from Brøndby. He excelled as a youth team player for Ajax under Danny Blind. In 2004, however, he was allowed to leave Ajax by manager Ronald Koeman and he joined RKC Waalwijk on a free transfer. There he made his professional debut on 15 August 2004 in a goalless draw against Groningen.

Return to Ajax
Two years later, Krohn-Dehli was re-signed by Ajax on a free transfer until 2009. The midfielder made his debut for Ajax on 17 September 2006 in a 2–0 league win against Roda JC Kerkrade. After the winter break with only three appearances for Ajax he was sent on loan to Sparta Rotterdam on 31 January 2007 for the remainder of the season. Five days later he made his first out of 12 appearances for Sparta against Roda JC Kerkrade. After his spell at Sparta and the summer break he returned to Ajax for the 2007–08 season.

Return to Brøndby
Ajax announced on 29 August 2008 that they would transfer Krohn-Dehli to Danish club Brøndby IF. He made his debut two days later on 31 August against FC Copenhagen.

Celta
On 21 August 2012, it was announced that Krohn-Dehli would be joining Celta de Vigo after completing a medical. His performances in 2014 led to interest from Newcastle United.

Sevilla
On 1 June 2015, Krohn-Dehli officially signed a two-year contract with fellow La Liga team Sevilla.

On 28 April 2016, he dislocated his left kneecap shortly after being subbed on in the first UEFA Europa League semi-final at Arena Lviv against Shakhtar Donetsk, much to the dismay of both teammates and opponents. He had knee surgery performed the following day at Clínica Sagrado Corazón de Sevilla after having flown back home with the rest of the squad. Later that day, following the surgery, Sevilla FC released a statement on the club's website, revealing that he would miss seven to eight months of action, depending on his rehabilitation. Almost six months later to the day, on 27 October, Sevilla released footage of a recovering Krohn-Dehli running on one of the club's training grounds. One month later, Krohn-Dehli was back on the training pitch with the rest of the squad.

Deportivo La Coruña
On 29 January 2018, Krohn-Dehli joined La Liga side Deportivo La Coruña on a free transfer and a one-and-a-half-year contract. Following the club's relegation from the highest tier, Krohn-Dehli was released in July 2019. On 10 July 2020, a year after leaving Deportivo, Krohn-Dehli announced through his agent that he had officially retired from professional football and would pursuit a career as a pundit.

International career
Krohn-Dehli made his debut for the Denmark national football team in a Euro 2008 qualification match against Liechtenstein on 11 October 2006.

Krohn-Dehli scored the only goal in Denmark's 1–0 victory over the Netherlands in UEFA Euro 2012. After that match, Krohn-Dehli said he was satisfied with scoring and told reporters after the game, "It's a little bit special for me as I played for eight years in Holland and have a Dutch girlfriend, so I think the whole family was cheering in Holland". He also scored the lone goal for Denmark in the final group stage game against Germany, a 1–2 loss.

In May 2018 he was named in Denmark's preliminary 35-man squad for the 2018 FIFA World Cup in Russia, returning after a 3 years absence.

After the World Cup, he announced his retirement from the national team.

Career statistics

Club

International
Source:

Denmark score listed first, score column indicates score after each Krohn-Dehli goal.

Honours
Sevilla
UEFA Europa League: 2015–16

References

External links

Danish national team profile 
Official Danish Superliga stats
Voetbal International profile

1983 births
Living people
Footballers from Copenhagen
Danish men's footballers
Denmark youth international footballers
Denmark under-21 international footballers
Denmark international footballers
Association football midfielders
Hvidovre IF players
AFC Ajax players
RKC Waalwijk players
Sparta Rotterdam players
Brøndby IF players
RC Celta de Vigo players
Sevilla FC players
Deportivo de La Coruña players
Eredivisie players
Danish Superliga players
La Liga players
UEFA Euro 2012 players
2018 FIFA World Cup players
Danish expatriate men's footballers
Expatriate footballers in the Netherlands
Expatriate footballers in Spain
Danish expatriate sportspeople in the Netherlands
Danish expatriate sportspeople in Spain